Göpfert or Goepfert is a German surname. Notable people with the surname include:

Bobby Goepfert (born 1983), American ice hockey player.
Carl Andreas Göpfert (1768–1818), German classical clarinettist and composer.
Dieter Göpfert (born 1957), German rower.
Jason Goepfert (born 1971), American writer.
Klaus-Peter Göpfert (born 1948), German sport wrestler.

See also
Goepfert Bluff, a bluff of Marie Byrd Land, Antarctica.
Goepfert case, a Hong Kong tax case.

German-language surnames
Surnames from given names